James Matthew McDonald, better known as Mr Egg (born 7 January 1959 in Inverness, Scotland) is a musician credited as being one of the founding fathers of UK Acid House music. After playing bass guitar in punk groups The Cunts and The Fakes, he formed the group Egebamyasi in 1984, and named it after Can's third studio album, citing Can and Captain Beefheart as influences.

Discography

Singles and EPs
Circumstances Survival SUR T 36 1986 UK
EBY E.P Groove Kissing GK008 1991 BEL
Acid Indigestion Pt I Groove Kissing GK016 1992 BEL
Acid Indigestion Pt 2 Groove Kissing GK017 1992 BEL
Acid Indigestion E.P IT Records IT002 1992 UK
Variation  T&B Vinyl TB002 1993 UK
Variation - (Lenny Dee Remix) T&B Vinyl TB003 1993 UK
I Want More Finiflex FF003 1993 UK
Ex Ovo Omnia (Liveggs) Finiflex FF006 1993 UK
Pizzacid  Finiflex FF0012 1994 UK
Eightball  Senior SNR009 1994 UK
Acidnation Soma SOMAO19 1994 UK
Store In A Cool Place Finiflex FF013 1995 UK
Remont (with Erasure) featuring Lucy Robson Finiflex FF014 1995 UK
Acid Indigestion Pt 3 Abbey Discs ABBYD003 1996 EIRE
1234 Beef Innovation ET002 1997 UK
Acid Indigestion Pt 4 Binary Baseline Bin Bass 005 2006 BEL
Bang the Boss (Digital Download) Fluid Groove 2006
Egebamyasi-The Remixes (Digital Download only) Fluid Groove 2006
I,v Lost Control-remix MacAcid Records 2007 UK

Albums
How To Boil An Egg UGT UGTLP/CD002 1995 UK
Mother Goose Subversive SUB40D 1997 UK

Compilations
Total Mr Egg Total 1990 UK
Total Vol 1 Mr Egg Parade Amoureuse PHOE12/CD 1991 GER
A Dance Sampler Vol 1 Braindamage Groove Kissing GK009CD 1992 BEL
A Dance Sampler Vol 2 Illegal Substance Groove Kissing GK026 1992 BEL
Mix The House Kinky Love Disco EVA 743121-116222 1992 NED
Techno Trance 2 Acid Indigestion Arcade 0170061 1992 NED
Techno Trance Acid Indigestion Koda Muzik 92.34.U.88.011 1992 TUR
Acidrave Apocalypse Hardcore EBY Tune RCA PD 75375 1992 Italy
And Away They Go I Want More Finiflex FF1001 1993 UK
This Is Techno Vol 6 Variation Continuum1930-2 1993 USA
Midnight Madness Variation Triumph TRLP 1CD 1993 UK
Trance Mix Sponge Melodia BMI 7001 1993 ISR
Future Music Magazine Superclouds Future Music 4/94 1994 UK
Unpaved Roads Route 2 Pizzacid NUT006 1995 NED
Ghetto Tone Variation (remix) Outland Records 94 12003 1995 NED
The Serious Road Trip Eightball MCD 11195 1995 UK
Mixmag Vol 19 Acidnation MML CD19 1995 UK
Suck Me Plasma Acidnation 7000 OHM 1995 GER
Hypno Trance 2 Acidnation Arcade 9902231 1995 GER
Quality Recordings Vol 2 Acidnation Soma CD003 1995 UK
Foundations (Coming Up from the Streets) Bambient The Big Issue FCl002CD 1996 UK
Endless Loops Vol 1 Acidnation Slush EL001 2005 CAN

Remixes
The Fugue - Sensitized (Sensi Version) Different Class 1994 UK
Dance Overdose - Overdose Stomp (Cement Mix) Resonance Recs 1994 UK
Dreadzone - Fight The Power (Acidzone Version) Totem Records 1994 UK
Chill FM - New Beginning  1994 UK
Gary Numan - Me, I Disconnect from You Beggars Banquet 1995 UK

References

External links
Egebamyasi.com
Egebamyasi Fan Site
MySpace

British electronic musicians
British techno musicians
British house musicians
Acid house musicians
Scottish electronic musicians
Living people
People from Inverness
1959 births